Andrew Blake (born 1948) is an American adult erotic film director and film producer. Blake has been inducted into both the AVN and XRCO Halls of Fame and is a medal recipient from the Worldfest-Houston International Film Festival for his first film NIGHT TRIPS.

Biography 
Andrew Blake began his career working on movies for Playboy, and then for Penthouse but shifted to working independently in the 1990s. Most of Blake's films are released through his own production company, Studio A Entertainment. Andrew Blake is a member of the AVN Hall of Fame (200?) and XRCO Hall of Fame (2003). Blake's films usually feature original music scores by the composer Raoul Valve.

Blake has described his work as "erotic fashion," and his films usually include fetish, bondage, and lesbian imagery, often excluding heterosexual intercourse entirely. Blake's earliest films were primarily works of softcore erotica, however, and that sensibility still informs his pacing and style. Early films made by Blake soon after he came into his own as an independent director are fully explicit and usually combine heterosexual intercourse with lesbian imagery while including much less fetish and bondage content than his later films.

An interview with Blake is included in the 9 to 5 – Days in Porn (2009) documentary film about the American porn industry.

Reception 
Blake's first major film, Night Trips, (1989), was awarded the silver medal in the Non-Theatrical Release Category at the Worldfest-Houston International Film Festival. Andrew Blake holds the distinction of being the first adult director to win a film award at a mainstream international film festival.

Andrew Blake's films are characterized by high production values, artistic stylization, and rigorous technique. His style has been compared to that of the seminal fashion photographer Helmut Newton, and described as "decadent, lush, opulent, unfailingly arousing, moneyed and sophisticated."

Sex writer Violet Blue says of Blake's work: "It's a whole different genre of explicit erotic filmmaking evident from the first frame -- pure high fashion, glossy candyland fantasy. It is luxuriously designed from nip tip to toe. And it's stylish as hell."

Pop Culture 
Andrew Blake has had a significant impact on pop film culture. Blake was the first adult director to win a crossover award with Night Trips filmed in 1989, which won the Silver Award Non-Theatrical Release at the WorldFest-Houston International Film Festival. Blake featured Dita Von Teese in a full-length feature film Corsets & Upskirts, which featured her as a pinup and highlighted her interest in the fetish and kink lifestyle further elevating her career as the world leading fetish burlesque star. Blake has been on the forefront of pop culture embracing technology, such as the early adoption of Twitter in 2011, and helped usher film based cinematography into the digital era. Transferring his films to high-definition digital versions, Blake set the standard for high definition erotica.

Awards (selected)

1999 AVN Award "Best All-Sex, Film" (High-Heels)
2000 AVN Award "Best All-Sex Film" (Playthings)
2002 AVN Award "Best Art Direction Film" (Blond & Brunettes)
2002 AVN Award "Best Cinematography" (Blond & Brunettes)
2002 Venus Award "Best Director USA"
2004 AVN Award "Best All Sex Film" (Hard Edge)
2004 AVN Award "Best Art Direction Film" (Hard Edge)
2004 AVN Award "Best Cinematography" (Hard Edge)
2004 AVN Award "Best Editing Film" (Hard Edge)
2005 AVN Award "Best Cinematography" (Flirts)
2008 AVN Award "Best Editing" (X)
2009 AVN Award "Best Cinematography" (Paid Companions)
2010 XBIZ Award "Excellence in Progressive Erotica"
2011 XBIZ Award "Best Editing" (Voyeur Within)
2013 AVN Award "Best Photography Website" (AndrewBlake.com)
2014 AVN Award "Best Glamour Website" (AndrewBlake.com)

Filmography (selected)

See also
The following listing includes directors also known for adult erotic films:

 Fashion photography
 Glamour photography
 Philip Mond
 Radley Metzger
 Tinto Brass

References

External links 

 .
 Andrew Blake - Films at andrewblake.com.
 .
 .
 Andrew Blake - Interview (2008; Podcast).

American pornographic film directors
American pornographic film producers
American erotic photographers
Fashion photographers
Living people
1948 births